The title ACC Championship Game may refer to several sporting events that are sponsored by the Atlantic Coast Conference.
 The ACC Championship Game crowns the champion of the ACC football season.
 The championship game, or tournament final, of the ACC men's basketball tournament crowns the winner of the basketball season.
 The championship game, or tournament final, of the ACC women's basketball tournament crowns the winner of the basketball season.
 The championship game, or tournament final, of the ACC baseball tournament crowns the winner of the ACC baseball season.